The  is a Kofun period burial mound, located in the Amino neighborhood of the city of Kyōtango, Kyoto in the Kansai region of Japan. The tumulus was designated a National Historic Site of Japan in 1922.

Overview
It is located on a hill at the mouth of the Fukuta River that flows through the Tango Peninsula into the Sea of Japan. It dates from the middle of the Kofun period, or the end of the 4th century to the beginning of the 5th century. The surrounding area has a number of Yayoi period and Kofun period remains. The tumulus is orientated to the north-northeast and has an overall length of 201 meters, making it one of the largest on the Sea of Japan coast. The surface of the mound was covered in white fukiishi, and both cylindrical and figurative haniwa have been found. Among the haniwa, fragments of a type specific to the Tango region have been found. In addition, the tumulus is surrounded by incomplete moats with a width of 17 to 25 meters on east, south and west sides. As no excavation has been conducted, the details of the burial chamber are not clear.

During the Kofun period, this region of northern Kyoto prefecture had trade contacts with the Asian mainland, and the area around the mouth of the Takeno River was the center of an ancient kingdom. The tumulus was situated such that its white fukiishi would be visible as a landmark for any ships approaching the harbor. However, after the middle of the 5th century, trade decreased and the political center of the region shifted inland to the Tamba region.

The tumulus is about ten minutes by car from Amino Station on the Miyazu Line.

The National Historic Site designation includes the smaller circular  "Choshiyama Tumulus No. 1 and No. 2 Tumulus" nearby.

Total length 201 meters:
Anterior rectangular portion 80 meters wide x 10 meters high, 3-tier
Posterior circular portion 115 meter diameter x 16 meters high, 3-tiers

Gallery

See also
List of Historic Sites of Japan (Kyoto)

References

External links

 Kyōtango Tourist Information home page 
Kyōtango City home page 

History of Kyoto Prefecture
Kyōtango
Historic Sites of Japan
Archaeological sites in Japan
Kofun